The 2002 French Formula Three season was the 35th and the final French Formula Three Championship season. It began on 31 March at Nogaro and ended on 20 October at Magny-Cours after fourteen races.

Tristan Gommendy of ASM won races at Lédenon, Albi, Le Mans, Magny-Cours and had another five podiums and ultimately clinched the title. He finished 17 points clear of ARTA/Signature driver Renaud Derlot, who won Nogaro, Lédenon and Magny-Cours races. Third place went to Gommendy's teammate Olivier Pla, who finished on the first position at Croix-en-Ternois and Le Mans. Bruno Besson, Derek Hayes and Yuji Ide were another race winners.

Teams and drivers
 All cars competed on Michelin tyres.

Race calendar and results
 All races were held in France.

Standings
Points are awarded as follows:

References

External links
 Standins on Driver Database

Formula Three
French
French Formula Three Championship
French Formula 3